Leeds Rhinos is an English professional rugby league club based in Leeds, West Yorkshire.

This list details the club's achievements in all competitions for each season.

Super League

Notes

Bibliography
 
 

Seasons
Leeds Rhinos
British rugby league lists